In mathematics, the Menger curvature of a triple of points in n-dimensional Euclidean space Rn is the reciprocal of the radius of the circle that passes through the three points. It is named after the Austrian-American mathematician Karl Menger.

Definition

Let x, y and z be three points in Rn; for simplicity, assume for the moment that all three points are distinct and do not lie on a single straight line. Let Π ⊆ Rn be the Euclidean plane spanned by x, y and z and let C ⊆ Π be the unique Euclidean circle in Π that passes through x, y and z (the circumcircle of x, y and z). Let R be the radius of C. Then the Menger curvature c(x, y, z) of x, y and z is defined by

If the three points are collinear, R can be informally considered to be +∞, and it makes rigorous sense to define c(x, y, z) = 0. If any of the points x, y and z are coincident, again define c(x, y, z) = 0.

Using the well-known formula relating the side lengths of a triangle to its area, it follows that

where A denotes the area of the triangle spanned by x, y and z.

Another way of computing Menger curvature is the identity

where  is the angle made at the y-corner of the triangle spanned by x,y,z.

Menger curvature may also be defined on a general metric space. If X is a metric space and x,y, and z are distinct points, let f be an isometry from  into . Define the Menger curvature of these points to be

Note that f need not be defined on all of X, just on {x,y,z}, and the value cX (x,y,z) is independent of the choice of f.

Integral Curvature Rectifiability

Menger curvature can be used to give quantitative conditions for when sets in  may be rectifiable. For a Borel measure  on a Euclidean space  define

 

 A Borel set  is rectifiable if , where  denotes one-dimensional Hausdorff measure restricted to the set .

The basic intuition behind the result is that Menger curvature measures how straight a given triple of points are (the smaller  is, the closer x,y, and z are to being collinear), and this integral quantity being finite is saying that the set E is flat on most small scales.  In particular, if the power in the integral is larger, our set is smoother than just being rectifiable

Then  if .

In the opposite direction, there is a result of Peter Jones:

Then there is a positive Radon measure  supported on  satisfying  for all  and  such that  (in particular, this measure is the Frostman measure associated to E). Moreover, if  for some constant C and all  and r>0, then . This last result follows from the Analyst's Traveling Salesman Theorem.

Analogous results hold in general metric spaces:

See also

 Menger-Melnikov curvature of a measure

External links

References

 

Curvature (mathematics)
Multi-dimensional geometry